Simon Hill (born 1 November 1967) is an English football commentator based in Australia.

British-based work

After graduating from the University of Portsmouth in 1990, Hill began his work in the field of journalism, initially writing for newspapers as a freelance author while studying for the NCTJ Pre-Entry Course in Newspaper Journalism.

He landed his first job at Red Dragon FM, a radio station in Cardiff, south Wales. Soon after, Hill's career progressed to BBC local radio and eventually BBC World Service and BBC Radio Five Live, working as both a presenter and commentator on Premiership and European Football.

Hill began his television career at BBC, working on the digital channel BBC News 24 before he was approached to work as a presenter and reporter the new ITV Sport Channel.

Simon then moved into freelancing roles for various TV and radio channels – including Capital Gold Radio.

Australian-based work

After more than a decade working in radio and television in the UK, Hill joined SBS Sport in Australia.

He was the local studio host for SBS's Ashes Cricket coverage (the main program was a relay from Channel 4 in the UK) in 2005 (Australia's tour of England).

He also commentated the 2006 FIFA World Cup as well as being a regular on Toyota World Sport and The World Game.

On 29 July 2006 he joined Fox Sports on a three-year deal as its main commentator for the A-League as well as Fox Sports's weekly football show called Total Football. Hill also gives half time and full-time analysis of the Premier League matches and supports Manchester City Football Club. On joining he said "For any true follower of football, Fox Sports is an absolute must, and for me it's a great fit." In addition to his work at Fox Sports, Hill is a monthly contributor to Australian football magazine FourFourTwo.

After 14 years at Fox Sports, Hill was made redundant in July 2020, claiming he was 'removed' from the network after a host of cost-cutting measures."

In his absence for the remainder of the postponed 2019-20 A-League season, Hill was the ground announcer at McDonald Jones Stadium, working on behalf of the Newcastle Jets for the club's home fixtures.

In August 2020, Hill announced a freelance affiliation with Optus Sport, joining the network as a commentator on their UEFA Champions League and UEFA Europa League broadcasts. Over several months, he appeared in their match day podcasts and provided a weekly column on the website, before leaving the network shortly after.

With former Australian footballer Alex Brosque, Hill currently hosts a podcast on the SEN Sydney 1170 Radio Network. From his void of work in leaving Fox Sports, Hill provides an A-League commentary feed for SEN. 

In August 2021, Hill signed with Channel 10 to commentate on the Socceroos, Matilda’s, A-League & W-League.

Personal life
Hill was born in Manchester to Audrey and George.

Career Journalistic or Commentary Coverage achievements

 1995 Toyota Cup - Japan
 1996 European Football Championship - England
 1998 African Cup of Nations - Burkina Faso
 1998 FIFA World Cup - France
 2004 Olympics - Athens, Greece
 2005 Ashes Series - England
 2005 World Cup Qualifier - Sydney, Australia and Montevideo, Uruguay
 2006 FIFA World Cup - Germany
 2006 onwards - A-League 
 2006-2015 - English Premier League
 2007 AFC Asian Cup - Indonesia, Malaysia, Thailand and Vietnam
 2015 AFC Asian Cup - Australia
 2019 AFC Asian Cup - UAE

References

Sources 
 SBS Profile of Simon Hill
 Hill and Harper join FOX Sports team

Australian expatriates in England
Australian television presenters
English association football commentators
English emigrants to Australia
Mass media people from Manchester
Alumni of the University of Portsmouth
Australian soccer commentators
1967 births
Living people
Australian sports journalists